Dale Layer (born May 16, 1958) is an American basketball coach, currently a special assistant to head coach Buzz Williams at Texas A&M in College Station, Texas. Previously he served as an assistant coach for the Greensboro Swarm of the NBA Development League. He was previously the head coach of the Liberty Flames men's basketball team. He was fired by the university on March 5, 2015 after finishing the season with only a 2–16 conference record and an 8–24 overall record.  It marks his second stint as a coach at Liberty; he spent the 2007-2008 campaign as an assistant to Ritchie McKay.

Biography
Layer started his coaching career in 1980 after graduating from his alma mater Eckerd College.  He spent seven of the next eight years at Eckerd (he was an assistant at Eastern Kentucky University during the 1982–1983 season.  He then made the jump to the head coaching ranks, accepting a job at Queens University of Charlotte.  He amassed 167 wins against 87 losses in nine years as the head coach, and also served as the school's athletic director.

In 1998, Layer accepted a job at Colorado State as an assistant after Ritchie McKay accepted the head coaching position.  Layer helped lead the Rams to an NIT appearance in 1999, defeating Mississippi State and Colorado before losing to the eventual champion, California.

When McKay left CSU in 2000, Layer was promoted to the head job.  Layer guided the team to its first NCAA Tournament bid in 13 years, in 2003.  He was twice voted the region's coach of the year by the National Basketball Coaches Association.  But after seven years and a 103–106 record (and 31–71 in conference play), Layer was fired.

He rejoined McKay's staff shortly after McKay accepted the job at Liberty University.  Layer stayed for a year before heading off to be an assistant to head coach Buzz Williams at Marquette.  After the 2008–2009 season, McKay left Liberty and accepted a job as associate head coach at the University of Virginia.  Liberty contacted Layer about filling the head coaching vacancy, and Layer accepted. Layer led the 2012–13 team to a surprise Big South championship and an NCAA bid with a 15–20 record.

On September 26, 2016, Layer was appointed an assistant coach of the Greensboro Swarm, a new NBA Development League franchise.  On June 13, 2017 Layer joined  Mercer University as an assistant coach.

Head coaching record

References

External links
 Colorado State Bio
 Liberty Bio

1958 births
Living people
American men's basketball players
Basketball coaches from Florida
Basketball players from Gainesville, Florida
College men's basketball head coaches in the United States
Colorado State Rams men's basketball coaches
Eastern Kentucky Colonels men's basketball coaches
Eckerd Tritons men's basketball players
Greensboro Swarm coaches
Liberty Flames basketball coaches
Marquette Golden Eagles men's basketball coaches
Mercer Bears men's basketball coaches
Queens Royals men's basketball coaches
Texas A&M Aggies men's basketball coaches
Virginia Tech Hokies men's basketball coaches
Sportspeople from Gainesville, Florida
Eckerd College alumni